Fala may refer to:

Places
Fala, Midlothian, Scotland
Fala, Ruše, Slovenia
Fala, Selnica ob Dravi, Slovenia
Fálá, Northern Sami-language name for Kvaløya, Finnmark, Norway

Languages
Fala language, a Romance language from the Portuguese-Galician subgroup spoken in Spain
Fala de Guine, or fala de negros, the language spoken by Atlantic Creoles

Other
Fala, a traditional percussion instrument used in the music of Samoa
FALA, armed wing of UNITA, Angolan rebel movement
FALA, or the Flagstaff Arts and Leadership Academy in Arizona
FALA, ICAO code of Lanseria International Airport
Fala (album), a 1985 Polish punk rock/reggae/new wave compilation album
Fala (dog), Scottish Terrier owned by Franklin D. Roosevelt
Fala (moth), a genus of moths
Max Fala, Samoan rugby player 
, ship that served the Polish Navy then Polish Border Guard